Guarico Municipal Airport  is an airport serving the city of San Juan de los Morros, the capital of Guárico state in Venezuela.

See also
Transport in Venezuela
List of airports in Venezuela

References

External links
OpenStreetMap - Guarico
OurAirports - Guarico
SkyVector - Guarico
Bing Maps - Guarico

Airports in Venezuela